The Scottish Aviation Twin Pioneer was a British STOL transport aircraft built by Scottish Aviation Limited at Prestwick Airport, Scotland, during the 1950s. It was designed for both civil and military operators. It was conceived as a twin-engined version of the Pioneer light transport. Both aircraft required "an area only 30m (99ft) by 275m (902ft) in which to operate."

Design and development

Powered by two Alvis Leonides radial engines, the Twin Pioneer was a high-wing cabin monoplane with a triple fin and rudder assembly and fixed tailwheel undercarriage. The prototype Twin Pioneer, registered G-ANTP, first flew at Prestwick Airport on 25 June 1955. Flight trials demonstrated that the aircraft had a very short landing run and the aircraft was displayed at the September 1955 Society of British Aircraft Constructors Show at Farnborough.

Three pre-production aircraft were built for trials, and sales and demonstrations.

In 1958, the 33rd aircraft was used as a prototype for the Series 2 with Pratt & Whitney Wasp R-1340 radial engines of which 5 had been ordered by Philippine Air Lines. In 1959, a Series 3 version was developed to use the improved Alvis Leonides 531 radial engine.

Early in its operational life in 1957 the Twin Pioneer suffered two fatal accidents due to fatigue failure which caused the outer panel of the wing to detach from the aircraft in flight. This issue required significant re-design of the structure and adversely impacted sales.

Operational history

The military version could carry external stores such as bombs under the stub wings. One aircraft became the first aircraft for the newly formed Royal Malaysian Air Force when it was delivered on 16 January 1962; the type served with the air force for 12 years.

The Royal Air Force ordered 39 aircraft, which were built between 1958 and 1959, deployed in Aden and the Far East. It was used extensively by British forces in the Malayan Emergency and the later confrontation in Borneo. In August 1959, No. 78 Squadron RAF at Khormaksar received some Twin Pioneers to supplement its single engine Pioneers.  The Twin Pioneers were employed in moving troops and supplies around the wilderness and on occasions lending support to the Sultan of Oman.  A series of double engine failures caused problems with the squadron losing two aircraft on the same day. Unsuitable soft and hard landing strips were also causes of failures during landings.

Other squadrons that operated the Twin Pioneers were No. 152 Squadron RAF based at Muharraq in Bahrain and No. 21 Squadron RAF, which reformed with the type at Benson in May 1959. The squadron then moved to Kenya and in June 1965 to Aden. No. 152 operated around the Persian Gulf and in 1959, No. 209 Squadron RAF based at Seletar began to receive Twin Pioneers. These operated in Borneo and Malaya.  The SRCU (Short Range Conversion Unit) at RAF Odiham also flew three Twin Pioneers for aircrew training. RAF No. 230 Squadron in the UK was the last military operator of the Twin Pioneer. The squadron operated the type in an interesting sand-colour camouflage scheme.

Although mainly used in military operations, the Twin Pioneer was also successful as a commercial transport for operation in areas without proper airfields, where unprepared surfaces were often the norm. Twin Pioneers were sold  as survey aircraft to oil exploration companies with some of the first sales to Rio Tinto Finance and Exploration Limited, and the Austrian and Swiss government survey departments. Three were used by the 'Kroonduif' in Dutch New Guinea.

One Twin Pioneer served as a STOL training aircraft with the Empire Test Pilot School (ETPS) at RAE Farnborough for many years.

Variants

Twin Pioneer : Prototype aircraft with  Alvis Leonides 503 radial engines, one built.
Twin Pioneer Series 1 : Production aircraft with Alvis Leonides 514 radial engines, 23 built.
Twin Pioneer CC.Mk 1 : Military version of the Series 1 for the Royal Air Force, 32 built.
Twin Pioneer Series 2 : Production aircraft with  Pratt & Whitney R-1340 radial engines, 6 built.
Twin Pioneer Series 3 : Production aircraft with  Alvis Leonides 531 radial engines, 18 built.
Twin Pioneer CC.Mk 2 : Military version of the Series 3 for the Royal Air Force, 7 built.

Many Series 1 aircraft were subsequently converted to Series 3 standard, including the prototype and all the remaining RAF CC.Mk 1 aircraft.

Operators

Civil Operators 

 Twin Pioneer Air
 Capricorn Air

 Austrian Airlines

 Eastern Provincial Airways

 TAME

 Flugfélag Íslands

 Garuda Indonesia
 Merpati Nusantara Airlines

 Civil Aviation Club of Iran

 Kuwait Airways

 Royal Air Lao

 Malaysia–Singapore Airlines

 Royal Nepal Airlines

 De Kroonduif

 Nigeria Airways

 Crown Colony of North Borneo

 Borneo Airways

 Fjellfly

 Philippines Airlines

 Sierra Leone Airways

 Swissair

 Air Atlantique (Classic Air Force)
 JF Airlines 
 Flight One Ltd.

Military operators

 Indonesian Air Force
 
 Royal Malaysian Air Force received 15 aircraft.

 Sultan of Oman's Air Force

 Royal Air Force
 No. 21 Squadron RAF (RAF Eastleigh then RAF Khormaksar – May 1959 to September 1967)
 No. 78 Squadron RAF (RAF Khormaksar – October 1958 to June 1965)
 No. 152 Squadron RAF (RAF Muharraq – December 1958 to June 1965)
 No. 209 Squadron RAF  (RAF Seletar – March 1959 to December 1968)
 No. 225 Squadron RAF
 No. 230 Squadron RAF (RAF Odiham – January 1960 to December 1961)
 No. 224 Group Support Flight
 No. 1310 Flight RAF
 RAF Katuanayake Station Flight operated one aircraft.
 RAF Odiham Station Flight
 Empire Test Pilots' School operated one aircraft from 1965 to 1974.
 Short Range Conversion Unit (RAF Odiham)

Aircraft on display

Australia
Twin Pioneer Mk 3 VH-SYS is airworthy in the collection of the Historical Aircraft Restoration Society at Shellharbour Airport near Wollongong, New South Wales
Twin Pioneer Mk 3 VH-EVC at Walker's Aviation Museum, Barellan, New South Wales

A Mk 1 aircraft is privately owned and is in open storage on a private airfield in Queensland

Indonesia
Twin Pioneer Mk 1 PK-GTB (ex JZ-PPZ) at Manuhua Air Force Base, Biak Numfor Regency, Papua

Malaysia

On display
Twin Pioneer Mk 3 FM1064 at the Melaka Transport Museum

Twin Pioneer Mk 3 FM1001 is in the collection of the Royal Malaysian Air Force Museum, located since 2021 at RMAF Sendayan, but the museum is closed

United Kingdom
On display
Twin Pioneer CC.1 XL993 at the Royal Air Force Museum Cosford, Shropshire, England.
Twin Pioneer Mk 2 G-BBVF at the National Museum of Flight, East Fortune, Scotland.

Stored or under restoration
Twin Pioneer Mk 3 G-AZHJ has been acquired by the South Wales Aviation Museum at St Athan for restoration as a museum exhibit.

Twin Pioneer Mk 2 G-APRS (G-BCWF) was airworthy in the collection of the Classic Air Force, Coventry, England. It was transported to Stirling, Scotland in July 2018 to be converted to a 'glamping' home.

Incidents and accidents
Structural failure caused the first Twin Pioneer crash, of JZ-PPX operated by Kroonduif of Indonesia on 30 Aug 1957 about 8 miles off Japen Island, Papua New Guinea, both occupants died.
The same structural failure also caused the second Twin Pioneer crash, of G-AOEO operated by Scottish Airlines on 7 Dec 1957 near Fezzan, Libya, all 6 on board died, including David McKintyre, the co-founder of Scottish Aviation Limited and a driving force behind the company.
On 10 March 1960, G-ANTP, operated by Scottish Airlines, crashed on take-off at Jorhat-Rowriah Airport, India, killing all 3 persons on board.
A recorded loss of a Twin Pioneer occurred on takeoff from Limbang Airport on 17 May 1967. The aircraft, operated by Malaysia-Singapore Airlines, carried the registration 9M-ANC. The cause was given as unknown.
In Royal Air Force service three aircraft had fatal accidents:
2 March 1961 – XL966 of 21 Squadron flew into rising ground at Mount Meru, Tanganyika, Tanzania, one killed.
14 February 1963 – XN318 of 209 Squadron flew into a wooded cliff in Borneo, all five onboard killed.
18 April 1963 – XL994 of 152 Squadron dived into the ground near Bu Hafafa in Oman, all eight onboard killed.
Two aircraft had accidents while being operated by Garuda Indonesian Airways:
On 14 May 1963, the Scottish Aviation Twin Pioneer 3, PK-GTC Garuda Indonesian Airways, damaged beyond repair. No one injuries.
On 20 September 1963, a Scottish Aviation Twin Pioneer 1, registration PK-GTB Garuda Indonesian Airways, crashed into terrain. Other reports say this Twin Pioneer was damaged on landing. Killed all 7 people on board.

Specifications (Twin Pioneer CC Mk.1)

See also

References

Bibliography

Ellis, Ken, Wrecks and Relics 25th Edition. Manchester, England. Crecy Publishing, 2016. 
Green, William. Macdonald Aircraft Handbook. London. Macdonald & Co. (Publishers) Ltd., 1964.
Donald, David, ed. The Encyclopedia of World Aircraft. London: Aerospace Publishing, 1997. .
Hemming, Nick. "'Primrose' & Friends: The Scottish Aviation Twin Pioneer". Air Enthusiast, Fifty-one, August to October 1983. pp. 21–31.
Jackson, A. J. British Civil Aircraft 1919-1972 Vol 3, 2nd Edition (reprint) 1988. London: Putnam 
Taylor, John W. R. Jane's All The World's Aircraft 1961–62. London: Sampson Low, Marston & Co. Ltd, 1961.
Thetford, Owen. Aircraft of the Royal Air Force 1918–57, 8th edition. London: Putnam, 1988.

External links

RAF Museum entry
"Twin Pioneer – Large Loads from Small Fields" a 1955 Flight article

1950s British civil utility aircraft
1950s British military utility aircraft
Twin Pioneer
Aircraft first flown in 1955
STOL aircraft
High-wing aircraft
Twin piston-engined tractor aircraft